John McEnroe and Mary Carillo were the defending champions but both players chose not to participate.

Virginia Ruzici, the winner of the women's singles and the women's doubles titles, reached the mixed doubles final, which she lost to Pavel Složil and Renáta Tomanová when her partner Patrice Dominguez, had to retire injured.

Draw

Finals

Top half

Bottom half

References

External links
1978 French Open – Doubles draws and results at the International Tennis Federation

Mixed Doubles
French Open by year – Mixed doubles